Satansnek Pass, or just Satansnek, is situated in the Eastern Cape, province of South Africa, on the road between Mthatha and Cala, Eastern Cape.

Mountain passes of the Eastern Cape